{{Infobox film
| name           = Short Circuit 2
| image          = Short circuit two ver2.jpg
| caption        = Theatrical release poster.
| director       = Kenneth Johnson
| producer       = David FosterGary FosterLawrence Turman
| writer         = Brent MaddockS.S. Wilson
| narrator       =
| starring       = 
| music          = Charles Fox
| cinematography = John McPherson 
| editing        = Conrad Buff IV
| studio         = The Turman-Foster Company
| distributor    = Tri-Star Pictures
| released       = 
| runtime        = 110 minutes
| country        = United States
| language       = English
| budget         = $15 million
| gross          = $21.6 million (domestic)
}}Short Circuit 2 is a 1988 American science fiction comedy film, the sequel to the 1986 film Short Circuit. It was directed by Kenneth Johnson and starred Fisher Stevens as Ben Jahveri, Michael McKean as Fred Ritter, Cynthia Gibb as Sandy Banatoni, and Tim Blaney as the voice of Johnny 5 (the main character – a friendly, naive, self-aware robot).

Plot
After being fired from Nova Robotics over the events of the first movie, Benjamin Jahveri (nee Jabituya) starts up his own business, "Titanic Toy Corporation", which specializes in making sophisticated toy robots that he builds by hand from the back of his truck. For two days, Ben has been in an unspecified U.S. metropolis peddling his toy robots on the street corners. One robot wanders away from his stand and makes its way into the office of Sandy Banatoni, an assistant buyer for Simpsons' toy department. Sandy tracks Ben down and orders 1,000 of his toys. Overhearing this offer is con artist Fred Ritter, who smooth-talks his way into brokering the transaction between Ben and Sandy, becoming Ben's business partner in the deal, and later acquires the funding Ben needs from a loan shark.

Ben and Fred, with some new workers, move into a derelict warehouse which, unknown to them, is the base of operations for thieves who are tunneling into a bank vault across the street to steal a set of jewels known as the Vanderveer Collection. The thieves (Saunders and Jones) assault Ben and Fred and destroy their equipment, causing the new workers to flee and preventing them from completing Sandy's order. However, Ben's friends Stephanie Speck and Newton Crosby have sent Johnny 5, a robot who became sentient after being struck by lightning whom Ben helped to create. When Saunders and Jones return, Johnny fends them off, then sets up self-defense mechanisms should they try to break in again. Johnny sets to work mass-producing the toys to meet Sandy's deadline but later leaves to explore the city. He runs afoul of many people, who are rude and unfriendly to him. He befriends one man, Oscar Baldwin, who works at the bank across the street from Ben and Fred's warehouse.

Fred, having learned that Johnny is worth $11 million, tries to sell him. Discovering this, Johnny escapes into the city, is taken into police custody, and is placed in the stolen goods warehouse, where he is claimed by Ben. Johnny uses his robotic abilities to help Ben court Sandy.

With time running out before the Vanderveer Collection is moved from the bank and in the lieu to keep Ben and Fred out of the way, Saunders and Jones locked them in the freezer of a Chinese restaurant. It is revealed that Oscar is the mastermind of the heist, and he tricks Johnny into finishing the tunnel leading to the vault. Ben and Fred get Sandy to save them, using polyphonic renditions of songs that Ben learned on his date with her as clues to their location. Having discovered the Vanderveer Collection, Johnny deduces Oscar's true intentions and is severely damaged by Saunders and Jones per Oscar’s orders. As Ben, Fred and Sandy return to the warehouse, the police arrest Ben and Sandy as suspects in the bank vault break-in just as Fred goes outside and searches for Johnny. Fred finds him in an alley, is horrified at his condition, and tells him of Ben’s arrest.

Fred attempts to repair Johnny by breaking into a Radio Shack and follows Johnny's guidance, but with limited success and without Manic Mike's knowledge whilst witnessing a broken alarm system. Ben and Sandy are cleared of any charges for the break-in and persuade the police to help locate Johnny. An enraged Johnny vows revenge for Oscar’s betrayal, and with Fred’s help, tracks down Oscar and his accomplices. Saunders and Jones are caught by Fred and Johnny and later arrested by the police. However, Oscar attacks Fred and attempts to flee on a boat. Johnny gives chase and, with not much time left on his backup battery, uses a crane to swing Tarzan-style to capture Oscar, who is then apprehended by police. Ben, Fred, and Sandy also arrive and tend to an exhausted Johnny while the last of his power supply depletes. Ben revives Johnny with a defibrillator.

Johnny is fully repaired becoming all gold plated and becomes a celebrity, while Ben, Fred, and Sandy start a new company called "Input Inc." with Johnny as its mascot. Johnny and Ben later take the Oath of Allegiance to become United States citizens. After the ceremony, when questioned by reporters about his thoughts on becoming the country's first robotic citizen, Johnny leaps into the air and exclaims "I feel alive!"

Cast
 Tim Blaney as the voice of Johnny 5, the self-aware robot
 Fisher Stevens as Benjamin Jabituya Jahveri, the peddler, later toy robot builder
 Michael McKean as Fred Ritter, the con artist
 Cynthia Gibb as Sandy Banatoni, Assistant Buyer, Simpson's Toy Department
 Jack Weston as Oscar Baldwin, the First Federal Trust Bank Worker, later Mastermind Heist
 David Hemblen as Jones, the young bank robber
 Dee McCafferty as Saunders, the older bank robber
 Don Lake as Manic Mike, the Radio Shack owner
 Ally Sheedy, as Stephanie Speck (voice only, uncredited)
 Gerry Parkes as the Priest with no name given

Production
Principal photography of the film took place between September 13 and December 1987 in Toronto, Ontario, Canada. Despite the film taking place in an American metropolis, much of the shots throughout the film featured prominent downtown Toronto landmarks. Five robots were used for filming the "Johnny 5" character. Reported complications arose with their hydraulic and electrical systems due to rainy and cold weather during production. The film's budget was reportedly $15 million.

The movie was originally titled Short Circuit 2: More Input, as seen on much of the promotional material.

Reception
Critical responseShort Circuit 2 received mixed reviews. On Rotten Tomatoes, it has an approval rating of 38% based on reviews from 13 critics, with an average rating of 4.1/10. Audiences surveyed by CinemaScore gave it a grade A−.

Vincent Canby, writing in The New York Times, gave Short Circuit 2 a negative review. He wrote: "For anyone over the age of 6, the film is as much fun as wearing wet sneakers". Rita Kempley, for The Washington Post, gave it a mixed review (6/10) saying: "Short Circuit 2 is unabashedly mawkish and sophomoric, and the actors support the technology. But if you're a kid, or an adult with an Erector Set, you might just enjoy this summer-weight caper". Most of the positive reviews were accepting of the film's flaws. Variety added: "Mild and meek, Short Circuit 2 has an uncomplicated sweetness as a successful follow-up to the original robot kiddie comedy".

Siskel & Ebert, having disliked the first film, gave Short Circuit 2 "two thumbs up". Roger Ebert said the movie "will probably seem better the younger you are" but that it was "pleasant" and "entertaining". Gene Siskel called it "better than the original", said the dialogue made him "laugh out loud" and argued that "the movie works" because he "felt bad" when the robot was being attacked. A review in the Los Angeles Times noted that "Wilson and Maddock have improved considerably here. They're just as derivative and glib, but more thoughtful. Their construction is more deft, their dialogue is better, and they make Number Five come more alive."

Box office
At the box office, Short Circuit 2 placed 7th on its first weekend making $3,843,067. It finished with $21,630,088, down almost half from what the first Short Circuit film made. It ranked 45th at the U.S. box office in 1988.

Accolades
 Honored with the Winsor McCay Award [for career achievement]

The film was nominated at Saturn Awards in the categories Best Science Fiction Film and Best Special Effects (Eric Allard, Jeff Jarvis).

Home mediaShort Circuit 2 was released on August 7, 2001, and re-released on DVD on April 24, 2007, which included a "making-of featurette" on actor Fisher Stevens. In 2010, the film was released once again with alternative cover art. A Blu-ray disc of the film was released in April 2011, though no extras were included.

In 2021, a Blu-ray release of the movie was released in the United Kingdom, with several extras including commentary by Kenneth Johnson. 

SequelHot Cars, Cold Facts, made in 1990, is a short educational film featuring the character Johnny 5, voiced by Russell Turner. It also starred Gina Revarra as Lisa, John Hugh as Officer Dave, and Donald Bishop as Howard. The film takes place after Short Circuit 2''.

References

External links
 
 
 
 
 
 

1988 films
1980s science fiction comedy films
1980s heist films
American science fiction comedy films
American heist films
American robot films
American sequel films
1980s English-language films
Films directed by Kenneth Johnson (producer)
Puppet films
Films scored by Charles Fox
Films set in 1987
Films set in the United States
Films shot in Toronto
TriStar Pictures films
Films about human rights
1988 directorial debut films
1988 comedy films
1980s American films